The 1788–89 United States presidential election in New Jersey took place between December 15, 1788 – January 10, 1789 as part of the 1789 United States presidential election. The state legislature chose six representatives, or electors to the Electoral College, who voted for President and Vice President.

New Jersey, which had become the 3rd state on December 18, 1787, unanimously cast its 6 electoral votes for George Washington during its first presidential election.

See also
 United States presidential elections in New Jersey

References

New Jersey
1788-1789
1789 New Jersey elections